The Evangelical Orthodox Church (EOC), founded on January 15, 1979, is a small Christian syncretic denomination established by former leaders of Campus Crusade for Christ, who, reacting against the freewheeling Jesus People movement, developed their own synthesis of Evangelicalism, Eastern Orthodoxy, and Shepherding Movement principles.

History

On January 14, 1979, the six members of the General Apostolic Council of the New Covenant Apostolic Order (NCAO)—Peter Gillquist, Jack Sparks, Jon Braun, J.R. Ballew, Gordon Walker, and Kenneth Berven—stood in a circle and self-ordained each other bishops. The following day they announced the formation of a new denomination——the Evangelical Orthodox Church—consisting of congregations following the NCAO. According to NCAO leaders, the EOC was launched with 2,500 members in fifty churches organized into seventeen dioceses. However, former members reported the membership as less than 1,000.

Controversies 
The EOC generated controversy throughout its short history, mostly regarding its view of apostolic succession and of apostolic authority. In canonical orthodoxy the hierarchy of authority is based on belief in an unbroken line of apostolic succession, from which the appointment of bishops proceeds. Jack Sparks argued that any attempt to trace such a succession inevitably included false apostles and bad men. In place of the Eastern Orthodox tradition of apostolic succession, 
Sparks argued for “charismatic” succession.

The EOC was itself criticized by both secular and evangelical sources for the bishops’ exercise of binding authority over members.  One particular case involving disclosure of confidential communications from a penitent went to court. In that case the California Court of Appeals denied the EOC leaders’ claim to ecclesiastical privilege.

Dialogues 
In 1977, the first contact with the Eastern Orthodox Church was initiated through Orthodox seminarian and former Berkeley - Christian World Liberation Front member (Karl) John Bartke, who introduced them to Fr. Alexander Schmemann, Dean of St. Vladimir's Orthodox Theological Seminary of the Orthodox Church in America (OCA). EOC leaders invited seminary faculty to instruct them in Orthodoxy and pursued dialogues with the OCA 1978 to 1983, but talks broke down over the EOC’s conception of church government. EOC leaders also opened dialogue with the Greek Orthodox Archdiocese in America (GOArch) in 1981. In 1984 the bishops applied for EOC membership in the National Association of Evangelicals. Their application was tabled over concerns by members of the Executive Committee over the EOC’s teachings and practices. Growing impatient with lack of progress  in dialogues with the OCA and GOArch, the EOC bishops embarked on a pilgrimage to Istanbul where they were turned away and not given an audience with the Ecumenical Patriarch of the Orthodox Church. Orthodox sources have said that the two reasons that the Eastern Orthodox community was hesitant to embrace the EOC were the continued influence of Shepherding Movement teachings regarding hierarchical authority and the EOC bishops’ desire to remain as bishops, which was unacceptable as Orthodox bishops must be celibate and appointed by the appropriate authorities based on apostolic succession.

Disposition of parishes 
Fr. John Bartke, who had been a member of the Christian World Liberation Front with Jack Sparks and had acted as the primary intermediary with the AOCANA served as host for the initial set of chrismations and ordinations of the EOC at St. Michael's Church in Van Nuys, California.<ref>Gillquist, Becoming Orthodox', p. 141.</ref> The group of 20 parishes became known as the Antiochian Evangelical Orthodox Mission, which subsequently issued a statement to Metropolitan Philip stating that they knew what Orthodoxy was. This lasted until 1995 when it was disbanded and the parishes put under the standard diocesan framework of the archdiocese. 

See also
 African Orthodox Church
 Fr. Duane Pederson
 Independent Catholicism
 Independent sacramental movement

References

Sources
 Gillquist, Rev. Peter E. Becoming Orthodox: A Journey to the Ancient Christian Faith''. Ben Lomond, CA: Conciliar Press, 1989.

Further reading 

About the Evangelical Orthodox Church, a site by former members
 The Chicago Call
 History of the ARC, a communion with roots in the NCAO
 Twelve Tribe community  founded by former NCAO apostle Elbert Spriggs
 History of Spriggs' community mentioning his time with the NCAO

External links
 

Christian new religious movements
Greek Orthodox Church of Antioch
Christian organizations established in 1979
Evangelical denominations in North America
Independent Eastern Orthodox denominations
Eastern Orthodox Church bodies in North America
Evangelicalism in Sweden
Evangelicalism in Africa
Eastern Orthodoxy in Africa
Eastern Orthodoxy in Sweden
Christian denominations established in the 20th century